Pardeep Singh (born 29 April 1988) is an Indian-born Italian rugby union player. His usual position is as a Prop and he currently plays for Colorno in Top12.

References 

It's Rugby England Profile
ESPN Profile
Eurosport Profile

1988 births
Living people
Italian rugby union players
Rugby Colorno players
Rugby union props